Badger Explorer ASA is a Norwegian company headquartered in Stavanger, Norway. It developed a technology used to explore and map the extent of hydrocarbon resource and reserve base and provide long-term monitoring. Badger Explorer ASA was listed on the Oslo stock exchange in 2007 and has new ticker from May 2017.

Technology
The technology is based on an invention of the researcher at International Research Institute of Stavanger (IRIS). The invention was granted a patent in 2002 (Norway) and 2006 (USA). The Badger tool drills into the subsurface without a rig and buries itself. It carries an electrically powered drilling system and sensors, which continuously record data, producing logs while drilling, and providing continuous, long-term data in surveillance mode. The tool connects to the surface by a power and communication cable, which are initially spooled inside the tool and gradually released in the course of advancing.

References

External links
 Badger Explorer ASA has new ticker
 Record of Badger Explorer ASA in Proff, retrieved 01 Aug 2018
 Filed and granted patents of Badger Explorer ASA, retrieved 01 Aug 2018
 Badger Explorer prototypes and animations, retrieved 01 Aug 2018

Companies based in Stavanger
Companies listed on the Oslo Stock Exchange